1st Armored may refer to:

1st Armoured Division (Australia)
1st Canadian Armoured Brigade
1st Czechoslovak Armoured Brigade
1st Armored Division (France)
1st Armoured Division (Germany)
1st Armoured Division (India)
1st Armoured Brigade (Poland)
1st Armoured Division (Poland)
1st Armoured Division (Syria)
1st Armored Brigade (Ukraine)
1st Armoured Brigade (United Kingdom)
1st Armoured Division (United Kingdom)
1st Armored Division (United States)